Henderson C. Gill (born 16 January 1961) is an English former professional rugby league footballer. He played for Bradford Northern, Wigan and Rochdale Hornets in the Championship and South Sydney Rabbitohs in the NSWRL competition. Gill primarily played on the  during his career.

Background
Henderson Gill was born in Huddersfield, West Riding of Yorkshire, England

Career
Gill signed for Rochdale Hornets for the start of the 1980-81 season and finished the campaign as the side's leading try scorer with 18 touchdowns. His elusive and speedy style caught the attention for Wigan, who duly signed the winger for the start of the following season.
Despite a stocky build, Henderson was quick and used this to great effect scoring 145 tries for Wigan and 9 for Great Britain over his career. He was also a handy left-foot goal-kicker who represented Great Britain 15 times between 1981 and 1988 and England once in 1981. Gill made his international début playing for England with a try in a 20–15 win over Wales at Ninian Park in Cardiff. During the 1987–88 season, he played on the wing for Wigan in their 1987 World Club Challenge victory against the visiting Manly-Warringah Sea Eagles, won 8–2 by the home side in a try-less game.

Gill was selected to go on the 1988 Great Britain Lions tour of Australasia. His last test was against New Zealand in Christchurch.

County Cup Final appearances
Henderson Gill played , i.e. number 5, (replaced by interchange/substitute John Pendlebury) and scored a try in Wigan's 18–26 defeat by St. Helens in the 1984 Lancashire County Cup Final during the 1984–85 season at Central Park, Wigan, on Sunday 28 October 1984, played , and scored 5-conversions in Wigan's 27–6 victory over Oldham in the 1986 Lancashire County Cup Final during the 1986–87 season at Knowsley Road, St. Helens, on Sunday 19 October 1986, and played , and scored a try in the 28–16 victory Warrington in the 1991 Lancashire County Cup Final during the 1987–88 season at Knowsley Road, St. Helens, on Sunday 11 October 1987.

John Player/John Player Special Trophy Final appearances
Henderson Gill played , i.e. number 5, (replaced by interchange/substitute Brian Juliff) and scored a try in Wigan's 15–4 victory over Leeds in the 1982–83 John Player Trophy Final during the 1982–83 season at Elland Road, Leeds on Saturday 22 January 1983, played  in the 11–8 victory over Hull Kingston Rovers in the 1985–86 John Player Special Trophy Final during the 1985–86 season at Elland Road, Leeds on Saturday 11 January 1986, and played , and scored 2-tries, and a conversion in the 18–4 victory over Warrington in the 1986–87 John Player Special Trophy Final during the 1986–87 season at Burnden Park, Bolton on Saturday 10 January 1987.

References

External links
Henderson Gill Statistics at wigan.rlfans.com
Henderson Gill at wiganwarriors.com
Wigan profile

1961 births
Living people
Black British sportspeople
Expatriate sportspeople in Australia
Bradford Bulls players
Bramley RLFC players
England national rugby league team players
English rugby league players
Great Britain national rugby league team players
Rochdale Hornets players
Rugby league players from Huddersfield
Rugby league wingers
South Sydney Rabbitohs players
Wigan Warriors players
Yorkshire rugby league team players